Nina Andrycz (11 November 1912 – 31 January 2014) was a Polish actress and the wife of Józef Cyrankiewicz. She studied law at the Wilno University.

Selected filmography
 Warsaw Premiere (1951)
 Before Twilight (2009)

See also
 List of centenarians (actors, filmmakers and entertainers)

References

External links

1912 births
2014 deaths
People from Brest, Belarus
People from Brestsky Uyezd
Polish film actresses
20th-century Polish actresses
21st-century Polish actresses
Polish centenarians
Women centenarians
Recipients of the Gold Cross of Merit (Poland)
Commanders with Star of the Order of Polonia Restituta
Recipients of the Gold Medal for Merit to Culture – Gloria Artis
Burials at Powązki Cemetery